Wanda Dubieńska born Nowak (12 June 1895 – 28 November 1968) was a Polish fencer, tennis player, cross-country skier and sport celebrity and the daughter of Julian Nowak. She competed in the women's individual foil event at the 1924 Summer Olympics. She was the first woman to represent Poland at the Olympics. Dubieńska was buried in the Rakowicki Cemetery.

References

External links
 

1895 births
1968 deaths
Polish Austro-Hungarians
Polish female fencers
Polish foil fencers
Olympic fencers of Poland
Fencers at the 1924 Summer Olympics
Sportspeople from Kraków
Polish female tennis players
Polish female cross-country skiers
Burials at Rakowicki Cemetery
20th-century Polish women